Papua New Guinea competed in the 2014 Commonwealth Games in Glasgow, Scotland from 23 July to 3 August 2014. Papua New Guinea participated in the Commonwealth Games for the thirteenth time. Over its previous participations, its athletes won a total of nine medals, of which two gold. Swimmer Ryan Pini, Papua New Guinea's most successful competitor with a gold in 2006 and a silver in 2010, is not competing in Glasgow, but is present as "assistant coach and mentor" for PNG's swim team.

Medalists

Athletics

Men
Track & road events

Women
Track & road events

Judo

Men

Rugby sevens

Papua New Guinea has qualified a rugby sevens team.

Pool C

Swimming

Men

Women

Triathlon

Weightlifting

Men

Women

 Powerlifting

References

Nations at the 2014 Commonwealth Games
Papua New Guinea at the Commonwealth Games
2014 in Papua New Guinean sport